This is a list of public art in Wolverhampton, in the West Midlands, England. This list applies only to works of public art accessible in an outdoor public space. For example, this does not include artwork visible inside a museum.

Wolverhampton

City Centre

Queen Square

St Peter's Gardens

Wolverhampton Station

Ring Road

Wolverhampton Wanderers FC

Other city centre areas

West Park

Blakenhall

Heath Town

New Cross Hospital

Bilston

Town Centre

Black Country Route

Wednesfield

References 

Wolverhampton
Wolverhampton